Agriocleptus is a small genus of assassin bugs (insects belonging to the family Reduviidae).

The genus consists of 8 described species, all of which are found in Central and South America.

Partial species list
Agriocleptes albosparsus
Agriocleptes bergi Wygodzinsky, 1953
Agriocleptes wygodzinskyi Prosen & Martínez, 1953

References 

Reduviidae
Cimicomorpha genera
Hemiptera of Central America
Insects of South America